The 2017 Women's Tour de Yorkshire was a cycling one-day race that took place in Yorkshire in April 2017. It was the second edition of the Women's Tour de Yorkshire and was organised by Welcome to Yorkshire and the Amaury Sport Organisation.

The race was won by Lizzie Deignan.

Route
The women's stage started at Tadcaster and followed the same route as the men's race; leaving Tadcaster over the newly re-opened Tadcaster Bridge, the route took the riders through Knaresborough, through Lofthouse, Ripon, skirting Fountains Abbey and then into Harrogate where the race culminated on Parliament Street. The race started at 9:20 am and finished around 12:30 pm.

Teams
Eighteen teams were entered in the race. Listed alphabetically, these were;

Ale Cipollini
BePink–Cogeas
Boels Dolmans
Canyon-SRAM
Cyclane Pro Cycling

FDJ Nouvelle-Aquitaine Futuroscope
Fusion RT Fierlan
Hitec Products
Lares Waowdeals
NCC Group-Kuoata Torelli
Storey Racing
Sunsport Velo
Team Ford EcoBoost
Team Jadan Weldtite
Team Sunweb
Team WNT Pro Cycling
Wiggle-High5

Final classification

References

External links
Official Tour de Yorkshire past races website
Full results

Tour de Yorkshire
Tour de Yorkshire
Women
Tour